The Clayton Public Library, at 116 Walnut St. in Clayton, New Mexico, was built in 1939 as a New Deal construction work.  It was designed by Willard C. Kruger in Pueblo Revival architecture.  It is now known as the D.D. Monroe Civic Building.  It has served historically as a library, as a meeting hall, and as a clubhouse.

It was listed as one of the top 10 most endangered historic buildings in New Mexico in 2002.

It was listed on the National Register of Historic Places in 2002.

The Albert W. Thompson Memorial Library at 17 Chestnut Street currently serves as Clayton's public library.  It holds about 18,000 volumes and circulates about 12,000 annually.

See also

National Register of Historic Places listings in Union County, New Mexico

References

External links

Library buildings completed in 1939
Libraries on the National Register of Historic Places in New Mexico
Pueblo Revival architecture in New Mexico
Buildings and structures in Union County, New Mexico
National Register of Historic Places in Union County, New Mexico